Ayşe Gökkan  (born 1965 in Kulince, Sanliurfa) is a Kurdish journalist, feminist, spokeswoman of the Free Women Movement (TJA) and a former Mayor of Nusaybin. As a journalist, she has been active in news outlets such as Özgür Gündem or Azadiya Welat. Gökkan was sentenced to 30 years imprisonment on grounds that she was a leader and a member of a terror organization in October 2021.

Early life and education 
She was born in the village Kulince in Suruç, Şanlıurfa Province. After having attended primary school in her village, she graduated from high school in Urfa. Later she studied journalism at the American University of Northern Cyprus from which she graduated in 1998.

Political career 
She was an active member of the People's Labour Party (HEP), the Democracy Party (DEP), the People's Democracy Party (HADEP) the Democratic People's Party (DEHAP) and the Democratic Society Party (DTP). For the HADEP she was a candidate for the Grand National Assembly of Turkey but was not elected as the party didn't pass the electoral threshold of 10 %.  Representing the DTP, she was elected as the mayor of Nusaybin in the local elections of 2009. As Mayor of Nusaybin she opposed the construction of the border wall between the pro-Kurdish administration in Rojava and Turkey in 2013.

Legal prosecution 
According to a news-statement from the Peoples' Democratic Party  Gökkan has been detained for more than 80 times. She was detained again in January 2021 at her house in Kayapinar, Diyarbakir and accused of being a member of the Kurdistan Communities Union, the Democratic Society Congress, the Free Women Movement and a leader and member of a terrorist organization. In October 2021, Gökkan was sentenced to 30 years imprisonment on grounds that she was a leader and a member of a terror organization. According to the International Federation of Human Rights, she was not permitted to defend herself in the Kurdish language during the trial and her lawyers abstained of preparing a defense in the last hearing because they and representatives of the Diyarbakir Bar Association were assaulted and mistreated by the police present in the courtroom in a past hearing.

References 

1965 births
Living people
21st-century Kurdish women politicians
21st-century Turkish women politicians
21st-century Turkish politicians
People from Suruç
Democratic Society Party politicians
Women mayors of places in Turkey
Mayors of places in Turkey
Turkish prisoners and detainees
Kurdish feminists